The NASA Institute for Advanced Concepts (NIAC) is a NASA program for development of far reaching, long term advanced concepts by "creating breakthroughs, radically better or entirely new aerospace concepts". The program operated under the name NASA Institute for Advanced Concepts from 1998 until 2007 (managed by the Universities Space Research Association on behalf of NASA), and was reestablished in 2011 under the name NASA Innovative Advanced Concepts and continues to the present. The NIAC program funds work on revolutionary aeronautics and space concepts that can dramatically impact how NASA develops and conducts its missions.

History
The NASA Institute for Advanced Concepts (NIAC) was a NASA-funded program that was operated by the Universities Space Research Association (USRA) for NASA from 1998 until its closure on 31 August 2007. NIAC was to serve as "an independent open forum, a high-level point of entry to NASA for an external community of innovators, and an external capability for analysis and definition of advanced aeronautics and space concepts to complement the advanced concept activities conducted within NASA."   NIAC sought proposals for revolutionary aeronautics and space concepts that could dramatically impact how NASA developed and conducted its missions. It provided a highly visible, recognizable, and high-level entry point for outside thinkers and researchers. NIAC encouraged proposers to think decades into the future in pursuit of concepts that would "leapfrog" the evolution of contemporary aerospace systems. While NIAC sought advanced concept proposals that stretch the imagination, these concepts were expected to be based on sound scientific principles and attainable within a 10 to 40-year time frame. From February 1998 to 2007, NIAC received a total of 1,309 proposals and awarded 126 Phase I grants and 42 Phase II contracts for a total value of $27.3 million.

NASA announced on March 1, 2011 that the NIAC concept would be re-established at NASA with similar goals, maintaining the acronym NIAC.

NIAC 1998–2007

Studies funded by the original NIAC 1998–2007 include

 Bio-Nano-Machines for Space Applications – Constantinos Mavroidis
 System Feasibility Demonstrations of Caves and Subsurface Constructs for Mars Habitation and Scientific Exploration (Caves of Mars Project) – Penelope J. Boston
 Lunar space elevator – Jerome Pearson – final report.pdf
 Magnetic sail – Robert Zubrin
 Mars Entomopter – Anthony Colozza / Robert Michelson – Phase II final report.pdf
 Mini-magnetospheric plasma propulsion – Robert M. Winglee
 Momentum exchange tether – Thomas J. Bogar – final report.pdf
 New Worlds Mission – Webster Cash
 Space elevator – Bradley C. Edwards

Closing of the Original NIAC
On July 2, 2007, NIAC announced that "NASA, faced with the constraints of achieving the Vision for Space Exploration, has made the difficult decision to terminate NIAC, which has been funded by NASA since inception. Effective August 31, 2007, the original NIAC organization ceased operations.

Revised NIAC
Following the termination of the original NIAC program, Congress requested a review of the NIAC program by the United States National Research Council (NRC) of the National Academy of Sciences.  The review was done in 2009, and concluded that in order to achieve its mission, NASA needs "a mechanism to investigate visionary, far-reaching advanced concepts," and recommended that NIAC, or a NIAC-like program, should be reestablished.  Consistent with this recommendation, it was announced on March 1, 2011 that the NIAC was to be revived with similar goals  leading to the establishment in 2011 of a project within the NASA Office of Chief Technologist, the NASA Innovative Advanced Concepts, maintaining the acronym NIAC.  It is now part of the NASA Space Technology Mission Directorate (STMD).

According to Michael Gazarik, director of NASA's Space Technology Program, "Through the NASA Innovative Advanced Concepts program, NASA is taking the long-term view of technological investment and the advancement that is essential for accomplishing our missions. We are inventing the ways in which next-generation aircraft and spacecraft will change the world and inspiring Americans to take bold steps."

2011 NIAC Project Selections
The revived NIAC, with the slightly-changed name "NASA Innovative Advanced Concepts," funded thirty phase-I studies in 2011 to investigate advanced concepts.

Duda, Kevin: Variable Vector Countermeasure Suit (V2Suit) for Space Habitation and Exploration
Ferguson, Scott: Enabling All-Access Mobility for Planetary Exploration Vehicles via Transformative Reconfiguration
Gilland, James: The Potential for Ambient Plasma Wave Propulsion
Gregory, Daniel: Space Debris Elimination (SpaDE)
Hogue, Michael: Regolith Derived Heat Shield for a Planetary Body Entry and Descent System with In-Situ Fabrication
Hohman, Kurt: Atmospheric Breathing Electric Thruster for Planetary Exploration
Howe, Steven: Economical Radioisotope Power
Khoshnevis, Behrokh: Contour Crafting Simulation Plan for Lunar Settlement Infrastructure Build-Up
Kwiat, Paul: Entanglement-assisted Communication System for NASA's Deep-Space Missions: Feasibility Test and Conceptual Design
Mankins, John: SPS-ALPHA: The First Practical Solar Power Satellite via Arbitrarily Large PHased Array
Miller, David: High-temperature Superconductors as Electromagnetic Deployment and Support Structures in Spacecraft
Paul, Michael: Non-Radioisotope Power Systems For Sunless Solar System Exploration Missions
Pavone, Marco: Spacecraft/Rover Hybrids for the Exploration of Small Solar System Bodies
Ritter, Joe: Ultra-Light "Photonic Muscle" Space Structures
Scott, Gregory: Low Power Microrobotics Utilizing Biologically Inspired Energy Generation
Short, Kendra: Printable Spacecraft
Sibille, Laurent: In-Space Propulsion Engine Architecture based on Sublimation of Planetary Resources: from exploration robots to NEO mitigation
Silvera, Isaac: Metallic Hydrogen: A Game Changing Rocket Propellant
Slough, John: Nuclear Propulsion through Direct Conversion of Fusion Energy
Staehle, Robert: Interplanetary CubeSats: Opening the Solar System to a Broad Community at Lower Cost
Strekalov, Dmitry: Ghost Imaging of Space Objects
Stysley, Paul: Laser-Based Optical Trap for Remote Sampling of Interplanetary and Atmospheric Particulate Matter
Swartzlander, Grover: Steering of Solar Sails Using Optical Lift Force
Tarditi, Alfonso: Aneutronic Fusion Spacecraft Architecture
Thibeault, Sheila: Radiation Shielding Materials Containing Hydrogen, Boron, and Nitrogen: Systematic Computational and Experimental Study
Tripathi, Ram: Meeting the Grand Challenge of Protecting Astronaut's Health: Electrostatic Active Space Radiation Shielding for Deep Space Missions
Werka, Robert: Proposal for a Concept Assessment of a Fission Fragment Rocket Engine (FFRE) Propelled Spacecraft
Westover, Shayne: Radiation Protection and Architecture Utilizing High Temperature Superconducting Magnets
Whittaker, William: Technologies Enabling Exploration of Skylights, Lava Tubes and Caves
Wie, Bong: Optimal Dispersion of Near-Earth Objects

2012 NIAC Project Selections
In August 2012, NIAC announced selection of 18 new phase-I proposals, along with Phase-II grants for continuation of 10 projects selected in earlier solicitations. These include many projects ranging from Landsailing rovers on Venus to schemes to explore under the ice of Europa. Phase I projects selected were:

Agogino, Adrian: Super Ball Bot - Structures for Planetary Landing and Exploration
Arrieta, Juan: The Regolith Biters: A Divide-And-Conquer Architecture for Sample-Return Missions
Cohen, Marc: Robotic Asteroid Prospector (RAP) Staged from L-1: Start of the Deep Space Economy
Ditto, Thomas: HOMES - Holographic Optical Method for Exoplanet Spectroscopy
Flynn, Michael: Water Walls: Highly Reliable and Massively Redundant Life Support Architecture
Gellett, Wayne: Solid State Air Purification System
Hoyt, Robert: NanoTHOR: Low-Cost Launch of Nanosatellites to Deep Space
Hoyt, Robert: SpiderFab: Process for On-Orbit Construction of Kilometer-Scale Apertures
Kirtley, David: A Plasma Aerocapture and Entry System for Manned Missions and Planetary Deep Space Orbiters
Landis, Geoffrey: Venus Landsailing Rover
Lantoine, Gregory: MAGNETOUR: Surfing Planetary Systems on Electromagnetic and Multi-Body Gravity Fields
McCue, Leigh: Exploration of Under-Ice Regions with Ocean Profiling Agents (EUROPA)
Nosanov, Jeffrey: Solar System Escape Architecture for Revolutionary Science (SSEARS)
Predina, Joseph: NIST in Space: Better Remote Sensors for Better Science
Quadrelli, Marco: Orbiting Rainbows: Optical Manipulation of Aerosols and the Beginnings of Future Space Construction
Saif, Babak: Atom Interferometry for detection of Gravity Waves-a
Winglee, Robert: Sample Return Systems for Extreme Environments
Zha, GeCheng: Silent and Efficient Supersonic Bi-Directional Flying Wing

2013 NIAC Project Selections
In 2013 NIAC conducted a third solicitation for  proposals, with projects to start in the summer of 2013.  NASA selected 12 phase-I projects with a wide range of imaginative concepts, including 3-D printing of biomaterials, such as arrays of cells; using galactic rays to map the insides of asteroids; and an "eternal flight" platform that could hover in Earth's atmosphere, potentially providing better imaging, Wi-Fi, power generation, and other applications.  They selected 6 phase II projects, including photonic laser thrusters, extreme sample return, and innovative spherical robots designed for planetary exploration.

Phase I selections were:
Adams, Rob:  Pulsed Fission-Fusion (PuFF) Propulsion System
Bradford, John: Torpor Inducing Transfer Habitat For Human Stasis To Mars
Hemmati, Hamid: Two-Dimensional Planetary Surface Landers
Jerred, Nathan: Dual-mode Propulsion System Enabling CubeSat Exploration of the Solar System
Longman, Anthony: Growth Adapted Tensegrity Structures - A New Calculus for the Space Economy
Moore, Mark: Eternal Flight as the Solution for 'X'
Prettyman, Thomas: Deep Mapping of Small Solar System Bodies with Galactic Cosmic Ray Secondary Particle Showers
Rothschild, Lynn: Biomaterials out of thin air: in situ, on-demand printing of advanced biocomposites
Rovey, Joshua: Plasmonic Force Propulsion Revolutionizes Nano/PicoSatellite Capability
Stoica, Adrian: Transformers For Extreme Environments

2014 NIAC Project Selections
In 2013, NIAC conducted a fourth solicitation, and selected 12 projects for Phase-1 studies and 5 projects to continue on to phase II projects.  Projects selected include a study of hibernation for astronauts and a submarine operating on Saturn's moon Titan

2014 Phase I selections were:

Atchison, Justin:   Swarm Flyby Gravimetry
Boland, Eugene: Mars Ecopoiesis Test Bed
Cash, Webster: The Aragoscope: Ultra-High Resolution Optics at Low Cost
Chen, Bin: 3D Photocatalytic Air Processor for Dramatic Reduction of Life Support Mass & Complexity
Hoyt, Robert: WRANGLER: Capture and De-Spin of Asteroids and Space Debris
Matthies, Larry: Titan Aerial Daughtercraft
Miller, Timothy: Using the Hottest Particles in the Universe to Probe Icy Solar System Worlds
Nosanov, Jeffrey: PERISCOPE: PERIapsis Subsurface Cave OPtical Explorer
Oleson, Steven: Titan Submarine: Exploring the Depths of Kraken
Ono, Masahiro: Comet Hitchhiker: Harvesting Kinetic Energy from Small Bodies to Enable Fast and Low-Cost Deep Space Exploration
Streetman, Brett: Exploration Architecture with Quantum Inertial Gravimetry and In Situ ChipSat Sensors
Wiegmann, Bruce: Heliopause Electrostatic Rapid Transit System (HERTS)

2015 NIAC Project Selections
The 2015 Phase-1 projects included a hopping vehicle to visit Triton and others, and seven phase two projects. Phase I projects selected were:
Engblom, William: Virtual Flight Demonstration of Stratospheric Dual-Aircraft Platform
Graf, John: Thirsty Walls - A new paradigm for air revitalization in life support
Hecht, Michael: A Tall Ship and a Star to Steer Her By
Lewis, John: In-Space Manufacture of Storable Propellants 
Lubin, Philip: Directed Energy Propulsion for Interstellar Exploration (DEEP-IN)
Oleson, Steven: Triton Hopper: Exploring Neptune's Captured Kuiper Belt Object
Peck, Mason: Soft-Robotic Rover with Electrodynamic Power Scavenging
Plescia, Jeffrey: Seismic Exploration of Small Bodies
Paxton, Larry: CRICKET: Cryogenic Reservoir Inventory by Cost-Effective Kinetically Enhanced Technology
Sercel, Joel: APIS (Asteroid Provided In-Situ Supplies): 100MT Of Water from a Single Falcon 9
Stoica, Adrian WindBots: persistent in-situ science explorers for gas giants
Tabirian, Nelson: Thin-Film Broadband Large Area Imaging System
Ulmer, Melville: Aperture: A Precise Extremely large Reflective Telescope Using Re-configurable Elements
Wang, Joseph: CubeSat with Nanostructured Sensing Instrumentation for Planetary Exploration
Youngquist, Robert: Cryogenic Selective Surfaces

In addition, seven projects were selected for continuation into Phase II:
Atchison, Justin: Swarm Flyby Gravimetry
Chen, Bin: 3D Photocatalytic Air Processor for Dramatic Reduction of Life Support Mass and Complexity
Nosanov, Jeffrey: PERISCOPE: PERIapsis Subsurface Cave Optical Explorer
Oleson, Steven: Titan Submarine: Exploring the Depths of Kraken Mare
Paul, Michael: SCEPS in Space - Non-Radioisotope Power Systems for Sunless Solar System Exploration Missions
Stoica, Adrian: Trans-Formers for Lunar Extreme Environments: Ensuring Long-Term Operations in Regions of Darkness and Low Temperatures
Wiegmann, Bruce: Heliopause Electrostatic Rapid Transit System (HERTS)

2016 NIAC Project Selections
Phase I projects selected were:
Bayandor, Javid: Light Weight Multifunctional Planetary Probe for Extreme Environment Exploration and Locomotion
Bugga, Ratnakumar: Venus Interior Probe Using In-situ Power and Propulsion (VIP-INSPR)
Dunn, Jason: Reconstituting Asteroids into Mechanical Automata
Hughes, Gary: Molecular Composition Analysis of Distant Targets
Janson, Siegfried: Brane Craft
Mann, Chris: Stellar Echo Imaging of Exoplanets
Mueller, Robert: Mars Molniya Orbit Atmospheric Resource Mining
Ono, Masahiro: Journey to the Center of Icy Moons
Quadrelli, Marco: E-Glider: Active Electrostatic Flight for Airless Body Exploration
Rothschild, Lynn: Urban biomining meets printable electronics: end-to-end destination biological recycling and reprinting
Sauder, Jonathan: Automaton Rover for Extreme Environments (AREE)
Thomas, Stephanie: Fusion-Enabled Pluto Orbiter and Lander
VanWoerkom, Michael: NIMPH: Nano Icy Moons Propellant Harvester

In addition, eight projects were selected for continuation into Phase II:
Bradford, John: Advancing Torpor Inducing Transfer Habitats for Human Stasis to Mars
Engblom, William: Flight Demonstration of Novel Atmospheric Satellite Concept
Kirtley, David: Magnetoshell Aerocapture for Manned Missions and Planetary Deep Space Orbiters
Lubin, Philip: Directed Energy for Interstellar Study
Rovey, Joshua: Experimental Demonstration and System Analysis for Plasmonic Force Propulsion
Skelton, Robert: Tensegrity Approaches to In-Space Construction of a 1g Growable Habitat
Ulmer, Melville: Further Development of Aperture: A Precise Extremely Large Reflective Telescope Using Re-configurable Elements
Youngquist, Robert: Cryogenic Selective Surfaces

2017 NIAC Project Selections
The fifteen projects selected for Phase I were:
Adam Arkin: A Synthetic Biology Architecture to Detoxify and Enrich Mars Soil for Agriculture
John Brophy: A Breakthrough Propulsion Architecture for Interstellar Precursor Missions
John-Paul Clarke : Evacuated Airship for Mars Missions
Heidi Fearn: Mach Effects for In Space Propulsion: Interstellar Mission
Benjamin Goldman : Pluto Hop, Skip, and Jump Global
Jason Gruber: Turbolift
Kevin Kempton : Phobos L1 Operational Tether Experiment (PHLOTE)
Michael LaPointe: Gradient Field Imploding Liner Fusion Propulsion System
John Lewis : Massively Expanded NEA Accessibility via Microwave-Sintered Aerobrakes
Jay McMahon: Dismantling Rubble Pile Asteroids with AoES (Area-of-Effect Soft-bots)
Raymond Sedwick: Continuous Electrode Inertial Electrostatic Confinement Fusion
Joel Sercel: Sutter: Breakthrough Telescope Innovation for Asteroid Survey Missions to Start a Gold Rush in Space
Slava Turyshev: Direct Multipixel Imaging and Spectroscopy of an exoplanet with a Solar Gravity Lens Mission
Robert Youngquist: Solar Surfing
Nan Yu: A direct probe of dark energy interactions with a solar system laboratory

In addition, seven projects were selected for continuation into Phase II:
Ratnakumar Bugga: Venus Interior Probe Using In-situ Power and Propulsion (VIP-INSPR)
Gary Hughes: Remote Laser Evaporative Molecular Absorption Spectroscopy Sensor System
Siegfried Janson: Brane Craft Phase II
Chris Mann: Stellar Echo Imaging of Exoplanets
Jonathan Sauder: Automaton Rover for Extreme Environments (AREE)
Joel Sercel: Optical Mining of Asteroids, Moons, and Planets to Enable Sustainable Human Exploration and Space Industrialization
Stephanie Thomas: Fusion-Enabled Pluto Orbiter and Lander

2018 NIAC Project Selections
The sixteen projects selected for Phase I were:
Aliakbar Aghamohammadi: Shapeshifters from Science Fiction to Science Fact: Globetrotting from Titan's Rugged Cliffs to its Deep Seafloors
David Akin: Biobot: Innovative Offloading of Astronauts for More Effective Exploration
Jeffrey Balcerski: Lofted Environmental and Atmospheric Venus Sensors (LEAVES)
Sigrid Close: Meteoroid Impact Detection for Exploration of Asteroids (MIDEA)
Christine Hartzell: On-Orbit, Collision-Free Mapping of Small Orbital Debris
Chang-kwon Kang: Marsbee - Swarm of Flapping Wing Flyers for Enhanced Mars Exploration
John Kendra: Rotary Motion Extended Array Synthesis (R-MXAS)
Chris Limbach: PROCSIMA: Diffractionless Beamed Propulsion for Breakthrough Interstellar Missions
Gareth Meirion-Griffith: SPARROW: Steam Propelled Autonomous Retrieval Robot for Ocean Worlds
Hari Nayar: BALLET: BALloon Locomotion for Extreme Terrain
Lynn Rothschild: Myco-architecture off planet: growing surface structures at destination
Dmitry Savransky: Modular Active Self-Assembling Space Telescope Swarms
Nickolas Solomey: Astrophysics and Technical Study of a Solar Neutrino Spacecraft
Grover Swartzlander: Advanced Diffractive MetaFilm Sailcraft
Jordan Wachs: Spectrally-Resolved Synthetic Imaging Interferometer
Ryan Weed: Radioisotope Positron Propulsion

In addition, nine projects were selected for continuation into Phase II:
Robert Adams: Pulsed Fission-Fusion (PuFF) Propulsion Concept
John Brophy: A Breakthrough Propulsion Architecture for Interstellar Precursor Missions
Devon Crowe: Kilometer Space Telescope (KST)
Jay McMahon: Dismantling Rubble Pile Asteroids with AoES (Area-of-Effect Soft-bots)
Steven Oleson: Triton Hopper: Exploring Neptune's Captured Kuiper Belt Object
John Slough: Spacecraft Scale Magnetospheric Protection from Galactic Cosmic Radiation
Slava Turyshev: Direct Multipixel Imaging and Spectroscopy of an Exoplanet with a Solar Gravity Lens Mission
Michael VanWoerkom: NIMPH: Nano Icy Moons Propellant Harvester
James Woodward: Mach Effect for In Space Propulsion: Interstellar Mission

2019 NIAC Project Selections
The twelve projects selected for Phase I were:
Javid Bayandor: BREEZE- Bioinspired Ray for Extreme Environments and Zonal Exploration
Erik Brandon: Power Beaming for Long Life Venus Surface Missions
Ana Diaz Artiles: SmartSuit: A Hybrid, Intelligent, and Highly Mobile EVA Spacesuit for Next Generation Exploration Missions
Tom Ditto: Dual Use Exoplanet Telescope (DUET)
Yu Gu: Micro-Probes Propelled and Powered by Planetary Atmospheric Electricity (MP4AE)
Troy Howe: SPEAR Probe - An Ultra Lightweight Nuclear Electric Propulsion Probe for Deep Space Exploration
Noam Izenberg: RIPS: Ripcord Innovative Power System
Geoffrey Landis: Power for Interstellar Fly-by
Joel Sercel: Lunar-Polar Propellant Mining Outpost (LPMO): Affordable Exploration and Industrialization
John Slough: Crosscutting High Apogee Refueling Orbital Navigator (CHARON) for Active Debris Removal
George Sowers: Thermal Mining of Ices on Cold Solar System Bodies
Robert Staehle: Low-Cost SmallSats to Explore to Our Solar System's Boundaries

In addition, six projects were selected for continuation into Phase II:
Tom Ditto: The High Étendue Multiple Object Spectrographic Telescope (THE MOST)
John Kendra: Rotary-Motion-Extended Array Synthesis (R-MXAS)
Chris Limbach: Self-Guided Beamed Propulsion for Breakthrough Interstellar Missions
Nickolas Solomey: Astrophysics and Technical Lab Studies of a Solar Neutrino Spacecraft Detector
Grover Swartzlander: Diffractive Lightsails
Doug Willard: Solar Surfing
Also, two projects were selected for Phase III:
William Whittaker: Robotic Technologies Enabling the Exploration of Lunar Pits
Joel Sercel: Mini Bee Prototype to Demonstrate the Apis Mission Architecture and Optical Mining Technology

2020 NIAC Project Selections
The sixteen projects selected for Phase I were:
Saptarshi Bandyopadhyay: LCRT - Lunar Crater Radio Telescope on the Far-Side of the Moon
John Christian: StarNAV: An Architecture for Autonomous Spacecraft Navigation by the Relativistic Perturbation of Starlight
Artur Davoyan: Extreme Metamaterial Solar Sails for Breakthrough Space Exploration
Caroline Genzale: Fueling a Human Mission to Mars
Davide Guzzetti: Flat Fabrication of Progressively Self-Assembling Space Systems
Benjamin Hockman: Gravity Poppers: Hopping Probes for the Interior Mapping of Small Solar System Bodies
Steven Howe: Pulsed Plasma Rocket: Shielded, Fast Transits for Humans to Mars
Troy Howe: High Irradiance Peltier Operated Tungsten Exo-Reflector (HI-POWER)
Gerald Jackson: Deceleration of Interstellar Spacecraft Utilizing Antimatter
Matthew Kuhns: Instant Landing Pads for Artemis Lunar Missions
Richard Linares: Dynamic Orbital Slingshot for Rendezvous with Interstellar Objects
Philip Metzger: Aqua Factorem: Ultra Low-Energy Lunar Water Extraction
Robert Moses: Advanced Aerocapture System for Enabling Faster-Larger Planetary Science & Human Exploration Missions
Eldar Noe Dobrea: Heat Exchange-Driven Aircraft for Low Altitude and Surface Exploration of Venus
Robert Romanofsky: Magneto-Inductive Communications for Ocean Worlds
Lynn Rothschild: An Astropharmacy

In addition, six projects were selected for continuation into Phase II:
David Akin: Innovative Offloading of Astronauts for More Effective Exploration
Javid Bayandor: Lightweight Multifunctional Planetary Probe for Extreme Environment Exploration and Locomotion
Troy Howe: SPEAR Probe - An Ultra Lightweight Nuclear Electric Propulsion Probe for Deep Space Exploration
Masahiro Ono: Enceladus Vent Explorer
Joel Sercel: Lunar Polar Propellant Mining Outpost (LPMO): A Breakthrough for Lunar Exploration & Industry
Nan Yu: Gravity Observation and Dark Energy Detection Explorer in the Solar System

Also, one project was selected for continuation into Phase III:
Slava Turyshev: Direct Multipixel Imaging and Spectroscopy of an Exoplanet with a Solar Gravitational Lens Mission

See also
Advanced Propulsion Physics Laboratory
Advanced Concepts Team

References

External links
 NASA Institute for Advanced Concepts site at USRA
 List of NIAC studies funded 1998-2007
 NASA Innovative Advanced concepts site at the Office of the Chief Technologist at NASA
 List of NIAC studies funded 2011-present

NASA programs
Futures studies organizations